GOODE Ski Technologies is a sporting goods manufacturing corporation headquartered in Ogden, Utah. Its main products are carbon fiber-based snow skis, ski poles, water skis, and accessories.

History 

Dave Goode founded GOODE Ski Technologies in 1975. During the first fifteen years, the then Michigan-based company manufactured and marketed a full line of ski accessories.

In 1989, Goode patented a method for making carbon composite ski poles, then in 1996, the company patented a carbon fiber composite ski.

In 2001, the company expanded its factory and purchased the production assets of Volant skis, and currently produces a full line of carbon fiber snow skis.

In 2004, the corporate headquarters were relocated to Ogden, Utah to be closer to world-class snow and water skiing.

On January 15, 2020, the founder, Dave Goode, died in a small plane crash near Roy, Utah. Goode is survived by his parents, wife, four children, and two granddaughters.

References

External links

Companies based in Ogden, Utah
American companies established in 1975
Ski equipment manufacturers
Sporting goods manufacturers of the United States
Manufacturing companies based in Utah
1975 establishments in Michigan
Manufacturing companies established in 1975
Privately held companies based in Utah